Gian (Giovanni) Domenico Mansi (16 February 1692 – 27 September 1769) was an Italian prelate, theologian, scholar and historian, known for his massive works on the Church councils.

Biography 
He was born at Lucca, of a patrician family, and died archbishop of that city. At the age of sixteen he entered the Congregation of Clerics Regular of the Mother of God and made his profession in 1710. Except for some journeys made for purposes of study, his whole life, until his appointment as Archbishop of Lucca (1765), was spent in his religious home.

In 1758, after a sojourn at Rome, where he had been received by Cardinal Passionei, there was question of elevating him to the Sacred College, but his collaboration in an annotated edition of the famous Encyclopédie displeased Clement XIII. It should be remarked that the notes in this edition were intended to correct the text. Three years after his elevation to the episcopate he was smitten with an attack of apoplexy which left him suffering, deprived of the power of motion, until his death.

His long career was filled chiefly with the re-editing of erudite ecclesiastical works with notes and complementary matter. His name appears on the title-pages of ninety folio volumes and numerous quartos. An indefatigable worker, widely read and thoroughly trained, his output was chiefly of a mechanical order, and unoriginal because hurried. His task was most often limited to inserting notes and documents in the work to be reproduced and sending the whole result to the printer, a process which resulted in numberless shortcomings.

The only work worth mentioning that is all Mansi's own is his Tractatus de casibus et censuris reservatis, published in 1724, which brought him into difficulties with the Index Librorum Prohibitorum. The rest are all annotated editions. In 1726 there was Jo. Burch. Menckenii De Charlataneria eruditorum declamationes duae cum notis variorum; from 1725 to 1738, an annotated Latin translation of the three works of Dom Calmet—the Dictionnaire de la Bible, Prolégomènes et Dissertations, and Commentaire littéral.

The best-known publication of Mansi is his vast edition of the Councils, Sacrorum Conciliorum nova et amplissima collectio (31 vols., folio, Florence and Venice, 1758–98), which was stopped by lack of resources in the middle of the Council of Florence of 1438. The absence of an index renders it inconvenient, and in a critical point of view it leaves an immensity to be desired. Mansi saw only fourteen volumes of it published, the others were finished from his notes.

In 1748 he began to publish the first volume of a collection which was presented as a supplement to that of Coleti; the sixth and last volume of it appeared in 1752. The collection has been reprinted: in Paris by H. Welter, (1901-1927); and in Graz by the Akademische Druck- und Verlagsanstalt in 1960.  The 1901 edition has been digitized by the University of Michigan Law Library.

Selected list of editions and translations
 Augustin Calmet's 1720 dictionary as Dictionarium, Historicum, Criticum, Chronologicum, Geographicum, Biblicum, Latinis Litteris traditum a J. Dom. Mansi

Notes

References

Citations

Sources

External links 
 
 
 Mansi GD, Sacrorum Conciliorum Nova et Amplissima Collectio Original Latin text digitized by Google books and Gallica.

1692 births
1769 deaths
18th-century Latin-language writers
18th-century Italian male writers
18th-century Italian historians
18th-century Italian Roman Catholic theologians
Roman Catholic archbishops in Italy
Bishops of Lucca